Ahmed Mohamed (born 8 August 1981) is an Egyptian former field hockey player. He competed in the men's tournament at the 2004 Summer Olympics.

References

External links
 

1981 births
Living people
Egyptian male field hockey players
Olympic field hockey players of Egypt
Field hockey players at the 2004 Summer Olympics
Place of birth missing (living people)